The 2014 Travelers Tankard, southern Ontario's men's provincial curling championship, was held from January 27 to February 2 at the Smiths Falls Community Memorial Centre in Smiths Falls, Ontario. The winning Mark Bice team (skipped by Greg Balsdon) represented Ontario at the 2014 Tim Hortons Brier in Kamloops, British Columbia.

Teams

*Mark Bice skipped the team through the Zone and Regional playdowns, and thus the team was named after him. Greg Balsdon returned to the lineup as Skip for the Provincial Championship after missing 2 months due to injury. The team plays as a 5-man squad regularly during the Tour season.

Round robin standings

Results

Draw 1
January 27, 14:00

Draw 2
January 27, 19:30

Draw 3
January 28, 14:00

Draw 4
January 28, 19:00

Draw 5
January 29, 09:00

Draw 6
January 29, 14:00

Draw 7
January 29, 19:00

Draw 8
January 30, 14:00

Draw 9
January 30, 19:00

Draw 10
January 31, 14:00

Draw 11
January 31, 19:00

Playoffs

1 vs. 2
February 1, 14:00

3 vs. 4
February 1, 19:00

Semifinal
February 2, 09:00

Final
February 2, 13:30

Qualification
Southern Ontario zones ran from December 6–15, 2013 with regional tournaments scheduled for January 4–5. Two teams from each zone qualify to 4 regional tournaments, and two teams from each of the two tournaments qualify to provincials. Two additional teams qualify out of a second chance qualifier.  As defending champions, the Glenn Howard rink from the Coldwater and District Curling Club get an automatic berth in the Tankard.

Regional Qualifiers In Bold

Zone Qualification

Zone 1
December 6–8, at the RCMP Curling Club, Ottawa

Teams entered:
Ian MacAulay (Ottawa)
Chris Delage (Ottawa)
Alexander Dyer (Ottawa)
Willie Jeffries (Ottawa)
Matt Paul (Ottawa)
Brian Lewis (Ottawa)
Bowie Abbis-Mills (Ottawa)
Paul Adams (RCMP)
Mark Homan (Ottawa)
Gary Rowe (Ottawa)

Zone 2
December 6–8, at the RCMP Curling Club, Ottawa

Teams entered:
Greg Richardson (Rideau)
Howard Rajala (Rideau)
Dave Van Dine (Rideau)

Zone 3
December 7 at the Carleton Heights Curling Club, Ottawa

Teams entered:

Bryan Cochrane (City View)
Stephen Watson (Renfrew)

Both teams qualify as the only teams who entered

Zone 4
December 7 at the Trenton Curling Club, Trenton

Teams entered:

Jeff Clark (Loonie)
Bryce Rowe (Napanee)
Dennis Murray (Quinte)
Dave Collyer (Quinte)
Don Bowser (Cataraqui)

Zone 5
December 7 at the Lindsay Curling Club, Lindsay

Teams entered:

Shannon Beddows (Cannington)
Douglas Brewer (Peterborough)

Both teams qualify as the only teams who entered

Zone 6
December 14 at the Port Perry Community Curling Club in Port Perry

Teams entered:

Nathan Martin (Oshawa)
Dave Fisher (Oshawa Golf)
Mark Kean (Annandale)

Zone 7
December 14–15, at the Richmond Hill Curling Club, Richmond Hill

Teams entered:

Tom Worth (Bayview)
John Epping (Donalda)
Dennis Moretto (Richmond Hill)
Dave Coutanche (Richmond Hill)
Mike Anderson (Scarboro)
Rob Lobel (Thornhill) 
Michael Shepherd (Richmond Hill)

Zone 8
December 14–15, at the Weston Golf & Country Club, Toronto

Teams entered:

Roy Arndt (High Park)
Jonathan Duguay (Oakville)
Guy Racette (Royals)
Rob Retchless (Royals)
Kevin Flewwelling (Royals)
Darryl Prebble (Royals)
Josh Johnston (Royals)
Peter Corner (St. George's)
Paul Madgett (Oakville)
Aaron Clark (Weston)

Zone 9
December 7–8, at the Milton Curling Club in Milton

Teams entered:

Ryan Myler (Brampton)
Jake Walker (Chinguacousy)
Rayad Husain (Chinguacousy)
Denis Cordick (North Halton) 
Damien Villard (Milton)

Zone 10
December 7, at the Cookstown Curling Club, Cookstown

Teams entered:

Joe Frans (Bradford)
Andrew Thompson (Stroud)
Cory Heggestad (Orilia)

Zone 11
December 14–15, at the Curling Club of Collingwood, Collingwood

Teams entered:

Chris Ciasnocha (Collingwood)
Peter Gilbert (Collingwood)
Robert Rumfeldt (Collingwood)
Kyle Long (Wiarton)
Scott Ballantyne (Tara)
Kyle Steele (Collingwood)

Zone 12
December 7–8, at the Fergus Curling Club, Fergus

Teams entered:
Trevor Feil (Elora)
Derrick Hodgson (Guelph)
Richard Krell (Kitchener-Waterloo Granite)
Andrew Flemming (Westmount)
Peter Mellor (Kitchener-Waterloo Granite)

Zone 13
December 7–8, at the Glendale Golf & Country Club, Hamilton

Teams entered:

Brent Palmer (Burlington)
Rick Thurston (Dundas Granite)
Terry Corbin (Dundas Valley)
Simon Ouelet (Glendale)
Mark Bice (Glendale)
Scott Banner (Glendale)
Kris Blonski (Dundas Valley)

Zone 14
December 7–8, at the Palmerston Curling Club, Palmerston

Teams entered:

Chris DeCloet (Harriston) 
Craig Kochan (Harriston)
Mike Aprile (Listowel)
A. J. Schumacher (Walkerton)
Pat Ferris (Listowel)
Daryl Shane (Wingham)

Zone 15
December 7–8, St. Thomas Curling Club, St. Thomas

Teams entered:

Wayne Tuck, Jr. (Brant)
Aaron Squires (St. Thomas)
Peter Van Ymeren (St. Thomas)
Craig Van Ymeren (St. Thomas)
Rob Morin (St. Thomas)
Jason Malcho (Stratford)

Zone 16
December 14–15, Ilderton Curling Club, Ilderton

Teams entered:

John Young, Jr. (Chatham Granite)
Dale Kelly (Chatham Granite)
Bill Mitchell (Glencoe)
Jake Higgs (Glencoe)
Joel Moore (Highland)
Scott McDonald (Ilderton)
Chris Liscumb (Ilderton)
Nick Rizzo (Ilderton)

Regional qualification

Region 1
January 4–5 , Quinte Curling Club, Belleville

Region 2
January 4–5 , Lakefield Curling Club, Lakefield

Region 3
January 4–5 , Alliston Curling Club, Alliston

Region 4
January 4–5 , Dundas Granite Curling Club, Dundas

Challenge Round
January 10–13, at the Brampton Curling Club in Brampton

References

External links
Official site

Travelers Tankard
Ontario Tankard
Lanark County
Travelers Tankard